Ovidiopol is a coastal urban-type settlement in Odesa Oblast, Ukraine. Population:

History

The place is first mentioned as early as 17th century. Hacıdere belonged to Akkerman sanjak of Silistra Eyalet, or Kefe Eyalet where Akkerman sanjak was actually located. At Medieval times Akkerman, at that time known as Maurocastrum, was a trade port of Byzantine and later Genoese colonies out of the Southern coast of Crimea. In mid 18th century Hacıdere was a big populated place with a pier through which was conducted a grain trade. During the 1768–1774 Russo-Turkish War, in 1769 Hacıdere was burned down by Zaporizhian Cossacks led by Petro Kalnyshevskyi. About twenty years later in 1789 (during the 1787–1792 Russo-Turkish War) the revived town was stormed and captured by the Russian troops and by the 1791 Treaty of Jassy was transferred under the Russian administration. Just before it was captured by Russians, the French military engineer André-Joseph Lafitte-Clavé who visited the area in late 18th century (1787) described that it took them around an hour to swim on a raft from Akkerman to Adzhider.

The Adzhider (a Russian adaptation) fortress was built sometime around 1793 (end of 1792) soon after end of the 1787–1792 Russo-Turkish War and was among the three key fortresses in the area along with Hacibey fortress in Odesa and Middle fortress in Tiraspol. The fortress had a specially built harbor and was intended to stand against the Ottoman Akkerman Fortress on the other side of the Dniester Estuary (liman). The location for the fortress was picked by the Russian field marshal Alexander Suvorov. Construction of fortress was conducting by engineer captain Rester as a star fort on design of Flemish military engineer François Sainte de Wollant. The official date of laying the first stone in the fortress is 15 June 1793. It was this date that in the Russian and the Soviet historiography was considered as the date of foundation. In 1795 the Russian Empress Catherine the Great by hers decree officially renamed the newly built fortress as Ovidiopol. The fortress was built to protect entrance to Dniester from the Black Sea, cease Turkish attacks on Mykolaiv and Ochakiv and to serve as an intermediate storage of goods between Odesa and Dniester.

The town was named in 1795 after Ovid, the Roman poet exiled to the Black Sea coast, based on the claim of Dimitrie Cantemir in his Descriptio Moldaviae (1714–16) that a local lake near Bilhorod-Dnistrovskyi (probably the Dniester Liman itself, on whose eastern shore the town is located) was named in Romanian Lacul Ovidului (Ovid's Lake). In reality Ovid stayed in Tomis (today Romanian Constanta).

With the establishment of the fortress, around it appeared a settlement that in 1795 accounted for 266 people and was part of Tiraspol okrug (district) in Voznesensk Namestnichestvo (vice-royalty). Ovidiopol was granted status of a supernumerary town ("zashtatny gorod"). In December of 1796 Voznesensk Namestnichestvo was liquidated and the territory became part of Novorossiya Governorate. In the beginning of 19th century Novorossiya Governorate was liquidated and Ovidiopol existed with Kherson Governorate until the end of World War I and the Russian Civil War. In 1920-1925 Ovidiopol was in Odessa Governorate.

International relations

Twin towns — Sister cities
Ovidiopol is twinned with:
 Gniew, Poland
 Vrchlabí, Czech Republic

Gallery

References

External links
Official website of Ovidiopol
Ovidiopol

 
Odessky Uyezd
Urban-type settlements in Odesa Raion
Former forts
Star forts